In abstract algebra, an automorphism of a Lie algebra  is an isomorphism from  to itself, that is, a linear map preserving the Lie bracket.

Inner and outer automorphisms 
The group is denoted . These form a normal subgroup in the group of automorphisms, and the quotient  is known as the outer automorphism group.

Diagram automorphisms 
It is known that the outer automorphism group for a simple Lie algebra  is isomorphic to the group of diagram automorphisms for the corresponding Dynkin diagram in the classification of Lie algebras.

There are ways to concretely realize these automorphisms in the matrix representations of these groups. For , the automorphism can be realized as the negative transpose.

Derivations 
A derivation on a Lie algebra is a linear map

satisfying the Leibniz rule

They inherit a Lie algebra structure from the Lie algebra structure on the endomorphism algebra, and closure of the bracket follows from the Leibniz rule.

Through the Lie group-Lie algebra correspondence, the Lie group of automorphisms  corresponds to the Lie algebra of derivations .

For  finite, all derivations are inner.

Examples 

Theorems 
In particular, it says that , where  are root spaces, is a maximal solvable subalgebra (that is, a Borel subalgebra).

References 

E. Cartan, Le principe de dualité et la théorie des groupes simples et semi-simples. Bull. Sc. math. 49, 1925, pp. 361–374.

.

Morphisms
Lie algebras